Bryan Lee (March 16, 1943 – August 21, 2020) was an American blues guitarist and singer based in New Orleans, Louisiana. He was also known by the nickname 'Braille Blues Daddy' and was a fixture on Bourbon Street since the 1980s.

History
Lee was born on March 16, 1943, in Two Rivers, Wisconsin, United States, and completely lost his eyesight by the age of eight. His avid interest in early rock and blues was fostered through the 1950s by late night listening sessions via the Nashville-based radio station WLAC-AM, where he first encountered the sounds of Elmore James, Albert King and Albert Collins.

By his late teens, Lee was playing rhythm guitar in a regional band called The Glaciers that covered Elvis Presley, Little Richard and Chuck Berry material. Through the 1960s, Lee's interest turned to Chicago blues and he soon found himself immersed in that scene, opening for some of his boyhood heroes. In 1979 he released his first album named Beauty Isn't Always Visual.

In January 1982, Lee moved to New Orleans, eventually landing a steady gig at the Old Absinthe House on Bourbon Street becoming a favorite of tourists in the city's French Quarter. For the next 14 years, Lee and his Jump Street Five played five nights a week at that popular bar, developing a huge following and a solid reputation.

To the end of his life, Lee continued to perform in New Orleans.  He also toured several times a year in the Midwest, Eastern Seaboard, Rocky Mountain States and recently Europe and Brazil.  Lee appeared with Kenny Wayne Shepherd as the musical guest on The Tonight Show with Jay Leno on February 14, 2007.

He died on August 21, 2020, at the age of 77.

Discography

Albums
 1979  Beauty Isn't Always Visual
 1984  Bourbon Street Beat
 1991  The Blues Is... (Justin Time)
 1993  Memphis Bound (Justin Time)
 1995  Braille Blues Daddy (Justin Time)
 1995  Heat Seeking Missile (Justin Time)
 1997  Live at the Old Absinthe House Bar: Friday Night (Justin Time)
 1998  Live at the Old Absinthe House Bar, Vol. 2: Saturday (Justin Time)
 2000  Crawfish Lady (Justin Time)
 2002  Six String Therapy (Justin Time)
 2005  Live and Dangerous (Justin Time)
 2007  Katrina Was Her Name (Justin Time)
 2009  My Lady Don't Love My Lady (Justin Time)
 2010  Old School Blues
 2011  Live from Sao Paulo
 2013  Play One for Me (Severn Records)
 2018  Sanctuary (Earrelevant Records)

Compilation albums
 2003 Bryan Lee's Greatest Hits (Justin Time)

DVDs
 2006  Live and Dangerous (Justin Time)
Track list :
 Intro
 The Bounce 4:30
 The Walk 3:40
 Smokin Woman 4:32
 That Ain't Right 6:41
 Second Line Home 5:53
 Rocket 88 5:13
 Blues on My Mind 4:55
 Sugaree 3:38
 Don't Take My Blindness For Weakness 7:15
 Gave You What You Wanted 6:23
 No Need To Worry 5:50
 Hug Me Till It Hurts 7:05
 Six String Therapy 15:14
 Memphis Bound 12:15

References

External links
 The Bryan Lee Blues Band: Home of the Braille Blues Daddy (official site)
 [ Biography on Allmusic]
 Biography on Justin Time Records website
 Bryan Lee Discography on Discogs

1943 births
2020 deaths
American blues guitarists
American male guitarists
Blues musicians from New Orleans
People from Two Rivers, Wisconsin
Blind musicians
Guitarists from Louisiana
Guitarists from Wisconsin
20th-century American guitarists
20th-century American male musicians
Justin Time Records artists